Sexsmith/Exeter Airport  is located  northwest of Exeter, Ontario, Canada.

References

Registered aerodromes in Ontario